is a district located in Aichi Prefecture, Japan.

As of 1 October 2019, the district has an estimated population of 74,009 and a density of 1,846 persons per km2. The total area is 40.09 km2.

Towns and villages 
 Kanie
 Ōharu
 Tobishima

Mergers 
 On April 1, 2005 the following towns and villages were merged into Aisai City.
 Saori
 Saya
 Hachikai
 Tatsuta
 On April 1, 2006 the following towns were merged into Yatomi City.
 Yatomi
 Jūshiyama
 On March 22, 2010 the following towns were merged to form Ama City
 Shippō
 Jimokuji
 Miwa

Districts in Aichi Prefecture